”Elachista” arctodyta is a moth of the family Scythrididae. It is found in Australia, including Western Australia.

The wingspan is about 8 mm. The head, palpi, antennae and thorax are whitish-fuscous. The abdomen is black above, with some white scales and ochreous-whitish beneath. The forewings are whitish-fuscous, irregularly sprinkled with dark fuscous. The hindwings are grey. Adults have been recorded in October.

Taxonomy
The species was originally described in the family Elachistidae. It was recently moved to the Scythrididae, but has not been assigned to a new genus yet.

References

arctodyta
Moths described in 1897